CS Minaur Baia Mare, commonly known as Minaur Baia Mare, simply as Baia Mare or unofficially as Minerul Baia Mare, is a Romanian football club, based in Baia Mare, Maramureș County, northern Romania, founded in 1948. It currently plays in Romania's second league, Liga II, after promoting at the end of the 2021–22 season.

Chronology of names

Note: 2 years of inactivity between 2010–2012, and the team was refounded as FCM Baia Mare in the Liga IV.
Note: 1 year of inactivity between 2016–2017, and the team was refounded as CS Minaur Baia Mare in the Liga IV.

History

The club was founded in 1948, from the merger of Phoenix Baia Mare (founded in 1932) and Minaur Baia Mare (founded in 1927).

The club was dissolved in the summer of 2010 because of financial problems, but was refounded in the summer of 2012 under the name of FCM Baia Mare. Baia Mare was inactive for one season after withdrawing from the upcoming Liga II season due to financial difficulties on 5 August 2016. After one season of inactivity the club was refounded as Minaur Baia Mare, the historical name of the sports club, also used by the handball teams. The club was enrolled in the Liga IV – Maramureș County. In contrast to the handball section, the football section is known unofficially as Minerul Baia Mare, one of the past names of the club and the most representative for supporters. Also the football section colours are different from those used for handball, if for handball squads the traditional colours are white, black and orange, for football are yellow and blue.

Timeline

 1948 — CSM Baia Mare is founded;
 1950 — The name is changed to Metalul Baia Mare;
 1955 — Metalul Baia Mare is relegated in Liga III;
 1956 — The team become Energia Trustul Miner Baia Mare and win promotion in Liga II;
 1957 — The team become Minerul Baia Mare;
 1958 — Third name change in three years, this time back to CSM Baia Mare;
 1959 — CSM Baia Mare reach the final of Romanian Cup, only to be defeated by Dinamo București;
 1962 — Another name change, this time back to Minerul Baia Mare;
 1963 — Mircea Sasu become the first player ever to be selected from Minerul Baia Mare into the national team of Romania;
 1964 — Minerul Baia Mare win the second series of Liga II and win promotion into Liga I for the first time in their history, Phoenix / Carpati Baia Mare played before the World War II in the First League.
 1965 — As the team finish only 13th out of 14 in Liga I, they are relegated after only one year;
 1975 — The team become FC Baia Mare;
 1978 — FC Baia Mare win promotion into Liga I. It is the third in the history. The Golden Age starts;
 1979 — FC Baia Mare finish 5th out of 18 in Liga I;
 1980 — The best performance in Liga I as they finish 4th out of 18;
 1981 — A poor year followed by relegation back to Liga II, mainly due to internal issues;
 1982 — FC Baia Mare reach the final of Romanian Cup where they are defeated by Dinamo București. For the first time in their history FC Baia Mare play in Cup Winners' Cup, against Real Madrid of Spain.
 1983 — FC Baia Mare win the fourth promotion in their history into Liga I;
 1984 — A poor season in Liga I where the team finish 15th out of 18 but save themselves from relegation;
 1985 — FC Baia Mare is relegated back to Liga II. The Golden Era ends. The team become FC Maramureş Baia Mare.
 1993 — The Silver Era starts as FC Maramureş Baia Mare reach the semifinals of Romanian Cup;
 1994 — After a series of average and poor seasons in Liga II during the past decade, FC Maramureş Baia Mare win promotion in Liga I for the fifth time in their history;
 1995 — FC Maramureş Baia Mare reach the quarter-finals of Romanian Cup, but at the end of the season is relegated back to Liga II. The Silver Era ends.
 1998 — Another name change, this time back to FC Baia Mare;
 1999 — FC Baia Mare is relegated to Liga III for the second time in their history;
 2000 — The team promote back to Liga II;
 2001 — Second promotion in only two years, this time in Liga I, as FC Baia Mare win the promotion play-offs, however, the team's owner decides to trade the team's place in Liga I to another team, arguing the lack of financial resources to keep them over the competitional season. FC Baia Mare return to Liga II;
 2002 — FC Baia Mare qualify again for promotion play-offs but do not win promotion;
 2004 — Relegation in Liga III;
 2006 — After two years in Liga III, FC Baia Mare win promotion to Liga II;
 2007 — The club is relegated back to Liga III and face serious financial issues. Brazilian Ayres Cerqueira Simao becomes the first foreign player ever to play for FC Baia Mare;
 2008 — Despite being in the frame for a promotion back to Liga II, a series of poor results and a players strike due to unpaid wages and bonuses left the club in Liga III for at least one more year. Yet, at the beginning of the 2008 – 09 season the club manage to transfer some players with good experience in Liga I, such as: Daniel Rednic and Sorin Iodi, thus becoming top favourites to win promotion into Liga II.
 2009 – FC Baia Mare promoted to the Liga II after finishing first the 2008–09 Liga III.
 2010 – Finished 8th in the 2009–10 Liga II season and was dissolved shortly after.
 2012 – Refounded as FCM Baia Mare in the Liga IV.
 2013 – Promoted to the Liga III.
 2015 – Promoted to the Liga II.
 2016 – Withdrew from the upcoming Liga II season due to financial difficulties.
 2017 – Refounded as Minaur Baia Mare in the Liga IV.
 2018 – Promoted to the Liga III.

Performances
FC Baia Mare was a finalist in the Romanian Cup in 1959 and 1982, while in the Liga I, their best performance was 4th out of 18 at the end of the 1979–80 season.

The club played in the Liga I in other few occasions:  in 1964–65 (13th out of 14), 1978–79 (5th out of 18); 1980–81 (17th out of 18), 1983–84 (15th out of 18), 1984–85 (17th out of 18) and 1994–95 (17th out of 18).

The team played mainly in the Liga II where FC Baia Mare is ranked first in an all-time standing, obtaining the most points and scoring the most goals.

In 1982–83 FC Baia Mare played in Cup Winners' Cup against Real Madrid then coached by Alfredo Di Stéfano. After 0 : 0 in the first leg, FC Baia Mare lost 2–5 in the second leg. Koller and Buzgău scored for the Romanian side on Santiago Bernabeu.

In the summer of 1982, FC Baia Mare played a friendly game against AC Fiorentina in Italy and won 3 : 1. Giancarlo Antognoni and Francesco Graziani, both world champions with Italy at the 1982 World Cup, as well as Daniel Bertoni and Daniel Passarella, both world champions with Argentina at the 1978 World Cup played for AC Fiorentina in that game. This is, without doubt, the greatest achievement of FC Baia Mare to date.

The largest win in Divizia A is against FCM Galaţi, 7 : 1 in August 1979, however the club's finest hour in a Divizia A game came in June 1981 with a tremendous 5 : 0 win against Steaua Bucharest.

Honours 

The most successful team from Maramureș County.

Leagues 

 Liga I
 Best finish: 4th 1979–80
 Liga II
 Winners (4): 1963–64, 1977–78, 1982–83, 1993–94
 Runners-up (11): 1959–60, 1960–61, 1965–66, 1966–67, 1971–72, 1981–82, 1985–86, 1986–87, 1991–92, 2000–01, 2001–02
 Liga III
 Winners (7): 1956, 1999–2000, 2005–06, 2008–09, 2014–15, 2020–21, 2021–22
 Runners-up (1): 2019–20
 Liga IV – Maramureș County
 Winners (2): 2012–13, 2017–18

Cups 

 Cupa României
 Runners-up (2): 1958–59, 1981–82
 Cupa României – Maramureș County
 Winners (1): 2017–18

International

 European Cup Winners' Cup
 * First Round (1): 1982–83

In Europe

First leg

Second leg 

|}

Players

First team squad

Out on loan

Club Officials

Board of directors

Current technical staff

Statistics — Domestic Leagues

Up to and including the end of 2009–10 season

League and Cup History

From Minaur Baia Mare to Romania National Football Team
 Mircea Sasu 1 (6 caps / 1 goal): 1963: vs. Denmark (1 goal); 1964: vs. Bulgaria, vs. Hungary; 1965: vs. Czechoslovakia; 1966: vs. Portugal, vs. Czechoslovakia;1 Mircea Sasu played an extra three games for Romania after he left FC Baia Mare and scored one goal: 1967: vs. East Germany, vs. Congo (1 goal); 1968: vs. Austria.
 Alexandru Koller: (5 caps / 0 goals): 1976: vs. Iran; 1978: vs. Poland; 1979: vs. East Germany, vs. Poland, vs. USSR
 Alexandru Terheş: (3 caps / 0 goals): 1978: vs. Poland; 1979: vs. East Germany; 1980: Hungary
 Romulus Buia: (2 caps / 0 goals): 1991: vs. USA; 1992 vs. Mexico

Famous players
The following players who played for the club also had caps for their national team.

 Necula Răducanu – 61 caps for Romania, including at 1970 FIFA World Cup. Also played for Rapid Bucharest and Steaua Bucharest.
 Vasile Zavoda – 20 caps for Romania, also played for Steaua Bucharest;
 Vasile Gergely – 36 caps for Romania, including at 1970 FIFA World Cup. Also played for Dinamo Bucharest and Hertha BSC Berlin;
 Leontin Grozavu – 1 cap for Romania, played for Dinamo Bucharest and FC Saarbrücken.
  Vasile Miriuţă – 9 caps for Hungary. Also played for Dinamo Bucharest, Ferencvárosi TC, Energie Cottbus and MSV Duisburg;
 Francisc Zavoda – 8 caps for Romania, also played for Steaua Bucharest;
 Mircea Sasu – 9 caps for Romania. Also played for UT Arad, Dinamo Bucharest and Fenerbahçe SK;
 Zoltan Crişan – 46 caps for Romania. Also played for Universitatea Craiova;
Ioan Condruc - the captain from the golden period of Viorel Mateianu. He played also for UTA Arad when UTA won the title and defeated Feyenoord in ECC.
 Lucian Balan he won the ECC, European Super Cup, and was finalist in Intercontinental Cup final.
 Alexandru Koller – 5 caps for Romania.
 Alexandru Terheş – 3 caps for Romania.
 Romulus Buia – 2 caps for Romania. Also played for Germinal Ekeren, Universitatea Craiova and Dinamo Bucharest.

Famous coaches

  Gyula Bíró – coached in several countries including Hungary, Germany, Romania, Poland, Spain and Mexico;
  Florin Halagian – won several Liga I championships with Argeș Pitești and Dinamo București;
  Ştefan Onisie – won one Liga I championship with Steaua Bucharest;
  Viorel Mateianu – coached FC Baia Mare during their golden era when he invented some football techniques used today by Mircea Lucescu;
  Dumitru Nicolae Nicuşor – won several Liga I championships with Dinamo Bucharest;
  Ion Nunweiller – won two Liga I championships with Dinamo Bucharest;
  Ioan Sdrobiş – well known for promoting youngsters in the teams he coached. He discovered Cristian Chivu amongst many others.

References

 RomanianSoccer.ro
 Labtof.ro
 Informatia Zilei

External links
 
 

Football clubs in Maramureș County
Baia Mare
Association football clubs established in 1948
Liga I clubs
Liga II clubs
Liga III clubs
Liga IV clubs
Mining association football teams in Romania
1948 establishments in Romania